Teazer may refer to:

Teazer (ship), an American privateering ship of the War of 1812 
, various ships of the British Royal Navy
Young Teazer, an American privateer of the War of 1812.

See also
Teaser (disambiguation)